is a railway station in the village of Nishigō, Fukushima, Japan, operated by East Japan Railway Company (JR East).

Lines
The station is served by the Tōhoku Shinkansen high-speed line and the Tōhoku Main Line, and is 185.4 km from the starting point the Tōhoku Main Line at Tokyo Station.

Station layout
The shinkansen section consists of two opposed side platforms serving two tracks, with two centre tracks for non-stop passing trains. The Tōhoku Main Line section of the station consists of one side platform and one island platform, serving three tracks.

The station has a Midori no Madoguchi staffed ticket office.

Platforms

History
On 23 June 1982, it was renamed Shin-Shirakawa Station, coinciding with the opening of the Tohoku Shinkansen. The station was absorbed into the JR East network upon the privatization of the Japanese National Railways (JNR) on 1 April 1987.

Passenger statistics
In fiscal 2016, the station was used by an average of 2,999 passengers daily (boarding passengers only). The passenger figures for previous years are as shown below.

Surrounding area

 JR East Research Centre

Bus routes

Shin-Shirakawa
Track 1
JR BUS KANTO Hakuhō Line
Shirakawa Station 
Community buses
Shirakawa Station via Nanko Park 
Runs on only weekdays and Saturdays.
Track 2
JR BUS KANTO Hakuhō Line
Shin-Shirakawa Station - Nanko Park - Iwaki-Tanakura Station - Sobo'oka
Track 3
Fukushima Transportation
Shin-Shirakawa Station - Shirakawa Station - Iwaki-Ishikawa Station - Ishikawa Office
Shin-Shirakawa Station - Shirakawa Station - Shirasaka Station
Shin-Shirakawa Station - Shirakawa no Seki - Sekinomori Park
Limited express bus (operated by Fukushima Transportation and Aizu Bus)
Shin-Shirakawa Station - Shimogo Village Hall - Ouchijuku - Tō-no-Hetsuri Station - Yunokamionsen Station - Ashinomakionsen Station - Tsuruga Castle - Aizu-Wakamatsu Station
Runs on only holidays during summer.
Track 4
Night bus operated by Sakura Kotsu
Bound for Shinjuku Station

Shin-Shirakawa Kogenguchi Bus stop
 Fukushima Transportation
 Shobusawa
 Circular-route bus for Nishigo
 Shimo-Shibahara via Haranaka
 Kawatani via Haranaka
 Tsunago via Haranaka
 Manako
 Yuigahara via Oppara
 Kogen Hotel
 Reservation bus
British Hills

References

External links

  

Stations of East Japan Railway Company
Railway stations in Fukushima Prefecture
Tōhoku Shinkansen
Tōhoku Main Line
Railway stations in Japan opened in 1959
Nishigo, Fukushima